The Midland County Courthouse is a government building located at 301 West Main Street in Midland, Michigan. It was listed on the National Register of Historic Places in 1986. It is the only Tudor Revival style courthouse in the state.

History 
In 1858, Midland County constructed its first courthouse, a wood-framed structure. In 1919, Midland County decided to construct a new courthouse. Legal issues delayed the funding, but by 1924, money had been raised to fund the construction. In addition, Herbert H. Dow of Dow Chemical pledged additional funding, and hired architect Bloodgood Tuttle of Cleveland and Detroit to design the building, and mural artist Paul Honore of Detroit to create interior artwork. The contract to construct the building was awarded to Spence Brothers of Saginaw in late 1924, and construction began immediately at a site next door to the old courthouse. The building was completed in late 1925, and offices occupied by the beginning of 1926. The 1858 courthouse was razed soon after.

In 1958, a large cross-shaped addition was made, designed by architect Alden B. Dow of Midland. In 1979, a rear addition was constructed, designed by Robert E. Schwartz & Associates, Architect, also of Midland. The courthouse was renovated in 2018, and is still used by the county government.

Description 
The Midland County Courthouse is a three-story Tudor Revival style courthouse, measuring approximately 117 feet in length and 56 to 90 feet in depth. It is sited on a grade, so that only two stories appear on the front elevation. The main section of the roof is hipped, with two gable ends projecting; orange clay tiles cover the roof. Fieldstone is used as the base of the building up to the window sills. Above are stucco walls, with the second floor tusked under the eaves of the roof. Half-timbered gable ends, and dormers contain windows to the second floor.

References 

Courthouses on the National Register of Historic Places in Michigan
National Register of Historic Places in Midland County, Michigan
Tudor Revival architecture in Michigan
Government buildings completed in 1925
Government buildings on the National Register of Historic Places in Michigan